Prastio ( or Πραστειό) is a village located in the Limassol District of Cyprus, north of the village of Avdimou.

References

Communities in Limassol District